Mae Tuen may refer to:

 Mae Tuen, Chiang Mai
Mae Tuen, Lamphun